The 6th Medical Logistics Management Center (6MLMC), a direct reporting unit of U.S. Army Forces Command FORSCOM at Fort Bragg, North Carolina, with administrative control and training readiness authority to the Medical Research and Material Command USAMRMC Fort Detrick, Maryland serves as the Army's only deployable medical materiel management center worldwide.

Mission
When directed, 6th Medical Logistics Management Center (MLMC) deploys to provide centralized medical materiel lifecycle management to designated forces in order to sustain worldwide Geographical Combatant Command (GCC) contingency operations and Defense Support of Civil Authorities (DSCA).

Lineage and honors information
Lineage
 Constituted 23 February 1943 in the Army of the United States as the 6th Convalescent Hospital
 Activated 25 May 1943 at Camp Ellis, Illinois
 Inactivated 4 November 1945 at the New York Port of Embarkation
 Redesignated 29 November 1954 as the 6th Convalescent Center and allotted to the Regular Army
 Activated 17 January 1955 in Germany
 Inactivated 20 September 1958 in Germany
 Activated 29 November 1965 at Fort Sam Houston, Texas
 Inactivated 30 October 1971 in Vietnam
 Redesignated 16 November 1994 as the 6th Theater Medical Materiel Management Center (TMMMC) and activated at Fort Detrick, Maryland
 Redesignated 16 October 2000 as the 6th Medical Logistics Management Center (MLMC) and activated at Fort Detrick, Maryland
6th Medical Center Honors, campaign participation credit
 World War II: Normandy; Northern France; Rhineland; Ardennes-Alsace; Central Europe
 Vietnam: Counteroffensive; Counteroffensive, Phase II; Counteroffensive, Phase III; Tet Counteroffensive; Counteroffensive, Phase IV; Counteroffensive, Phase V; Counteroffensive, Phase VI; Tet 69/Counteroffensive; Summer-Fall 1969; Winter-Spring 1970; Sanctuary Counteroffensive; Counteroffensive, Phase VII; Consolidation I
Global War on Terror: Campaigns to be Determined
Decorations
 Meritorious Unit Commendation (Army) for EUROPEAN THEATER
 Meritorious Unit Commendation (Army) for VIETNAM 1966-1967
 Meritorious Unit Commendation (Army) for VIETNAM 1969-1970
 Meritorious Unit Commendation (Army) (Forward Team/Detachment) for Operations Enduring Freedom and Iraqi Freedom 1 JAN 2003 - 31 JAN 2004

Commanders 
6th Convalescent Center, Baumholder Kasserne, Federal Republic of Germany
The Commander of the 98th General Hospital also served as the commander of the 6th Convalescent Center, which was co-located

6th Convalescent Center, Republic of Vietnam

6th Medical Logistics Management Center

References

External links 
  6th MLMC Website

Frederick County, Maryland
006th Medical Logistics Management Center
1943 establishments in Illinois